Abuffard Eugène Augustin Woestyn (1813, in Orléans – 18 April 1861, in Paris) was a 19th-century French playwright, librettist, poet, journalist, chansonnier and writer.

Biography 
Woestyn met Victor Hugo at 14 and had him read his poems. He later became a critic and editor for Le Figaro, and by his profession, left a correspondence with authors like Honoré de Balzac from 1840. He also participated with the Journal du dimanche or among others with Le Gaulois, was a chief editor of the Foyer (1843) and wrote many articles, sometimes polemical, which led to a major quarrel with Frédérick Lemaître. In 1857, he also became chief editor of the Blason de l'Industrie française and in 1858 of the Figaro-programme.

His plays were presented on the most important Parisian stages of the 19th century, including the Théâtre de la Porte-Saint-Martin and the Théâtre de l'Ambigu-Comique.

Works 

1837: Essais poétiques
1838: Riens, poésies
1839: La voie sacrée ou les étapes de la gloire, five-act military drama, with Ernest Bourget and Hector Crémieux
1840: Bonaparte, ode
1841: Feuillets d'histoire dédiés au peuple
 Passion de Notre Seigneur Jésus-Christ, tirée des quatre Évangiles et traduite en vers français par Eugène Woestyn, ouvrage destiné à cultiver la mémoire des enfants dans les petits séminaires, les écoles chrétiennes et généralement toutes les maisons d'éducation
1847: Aux enfants de Paris. La Républicaine ou le Peuple est roi, cantata sung by Adalbert, lyrics by Eugène Woestyn, music by Amédée Artus
1847: Montdidier
1852: Le livre du cellier et de la conservation des vins
1852: Le livre de la broderie, du crochet et du filet
1852: Le livre de la danse
1852: Le livre de la dentelle, ou Manuel de la dentelière
1852: Le livre de la parfumerie de famille
1852: Le livre de la pianiste et du plain-chant
1852: Le Livre de l'hygiène domestique
1852: Le livre des conserves et confitures
1852: Le livre du découpage à table, ou Manuel de l'écuyer tranchant
1852: Le livre de la coiffure
1852: Le livre de l'art du chant
1852: Le Livre des dames poètes depuis les premiers siècles littéraires jusqu'à nos jours
1852: Le livre des domestiques
1852: Le livre des jeux de salon
1852: Le livre des amusements de la veillée
1852: La Saint Napoléon au village, patriotic cantata
1852: La ferme de Kilmoor, two-act opéra comique, with Alphonse Varney
1855: Histoire de la Saint-Napoléon
1855: Angleterre et France, with Charles Duggé, odes
1856: Guerre d'Orient, les victoires et conquêtes des armées alliées, 2 vol.
1856: Le Blason de l'industrie française. Verrerie
1857: Les Enfants du peuple, historical dramas
1860: Roi des îles, drama in five acts and eight tableaux, with Jan Czyński
undated: Les Folies Nouvelles, with Eugène Moreau

Bibliography 
 Joseph-Marie Quérard, La littérature française contemporaine: 1827-1849, 1857,  (read online)
 Le Maitron, Dictionnaire Biographique Mouvement Ouvrier (read online)
 T. J. Walsh, Second Empire Opera: The Théâtre Lyrique, Paris 1851-1870, 1981, 
 Stéphane Vachon, 1850, tombeau d'Honoré de Balzac, 2007, 
 Jean-Didier Wagneur, Françoise Cestor, Les Bohèmes, 1840-1870: Ecrivains - Journalistes - Artistes, 2014 (read online)

References

External links 
 Eugène Woestyn on data.bnf.fr

19th-century French journalists
French male journalists
19th-century French dramatists and playwrights
French librettists
19th-century French poets
French chansonniers
1813 births
Writers from Orléans
1861 deaths